Narsapura or Narasingapur is a village and a Gram panchayat in Sandur taluk, Bellary district in the Indian state of Karnataka. It is believed to be Ramanamalai and Desai's family were lived here first, the village was ruled by Sandur king. The village is surrounded by number of iron ore mines NMDC is one among them which is started acquiring land from farmers of the village and made township called Donimalai around 1969. Also MMTC to transport iron from Ranajithpura railway station.

Villages in Bellary district